The Anza is a  Alpine torrent of the Ossola in northern Italy. It flows from the glaciers of Monte Rosa through the Valle Anzasca and into the river Toce, of which it is a right tributary.

Its own principal tributaries are the Pedriola, the Tambach, the Orlovono and the Quarazza near Macugnaga and the Olocchia at Bannio Anzino.

Sources
This original version of this article included text translated from its counterpart in the Italian Wikipedia.

Rivers of Italy
Rivers of the Province of Verbano-Cusio-Ossola
Rivers of the Alps